Anton Bal (born 29 November 1963) is a Roman Catholic archbishop from Papua New Guinea.

Born in Yuri (Kundiawa), Bal was ordained to the priesthood on 17 December 1991. On 5 June 2007, Bal was appointed auxiliary bishop of the Roman Catholic Diocese of Kundiawa and titular bishop of Tamalluma; he was ordained a bishop on 10 September 2007. He was then appointed bishop of the Roman Catholic Diocese of Kundiawa on 12 January 2009. He was then appointed archbishop of the metropolitan Roman Catholic Archdiocese of Madang on 26 July 2019.

Notes and references

External links

1963 births
Living people
21st-century Roman Catholic archbishops in Papua New Guinea
People from Chimbu Province
Roman Catholic archbishops of Madang
Roman Catholic bishops of Kundiawa
Roman Catholic titular bishops
Papua New Guinean Roman Catholic archbishops